James Harvey Symington (1913–1987) Neche, North Dakota, USA was a member of a little known Christian sect based in his town. He was the Universal leader of the Exclusive Brethren.

Biography
Symington was born to Lyle and Ida (Hughes) Symington on August 28, 1913, and was one of 11 children.

He became leader of the Exclusive Brethren in 1970, after the sudden death of James Taylor Junior, shortly after the Aberdeen incident, one of the most significant events in the Brethren's history. Ron Fawkes, an ambitious leadership aspirant who attained some prominence among the Brethren, accused Symington of several false charges, none of which were upheld on investigation.

Symington died in 1987. At his death he was blind from adult-onset diabetes and was buried in Minneapolis, Minnesota.

Notes

References
  Background information on all Exclusive Brethren leaders from 1848 to current.

American Christian religious leaders
People from Pembina County, North Dakota
American Plymouth Brethren
1913 births
1987 deaths